Roland Owen McDole (born September 9, 1939) is a former American football defensive end.  He played college football at the University of Nebraska–Lincoln and professionally in the National Football League (NFL) and the American Football League (AFL).

Early life
McDole graduated from DeVilbiss High School in Toledo, Ohio in 1957.

Buffalo Bills
McDole played at left defensive end for the Buffalo Bills of the American Football League from 1963 to 1970 after spending the 1962 season with the AFL's Houston Oilers, anchoring the left side of the Bills' great defensive line.

The Bills finished tied with the Boston Patriots for the AFL's Eastern Division title in 1963, losing the playoff game to the Pats.  They would win the division for the next three years, together with two American Football League championships, in 1964 and in 1965.  McDole and his defensive linemates (left tackle Jim Dunaway, right tackle Tom Sestak, and right end Tom Day) held the opposition without a rushing touchdown in 17 straight games over the 1964–1965 seasons.  McDole was the defensive team captain during those years, an AFL All-Star in 1965 and 1967.  He was selected to the All-Time All-AFL second team.

Washington Redskins
From 1971 through 1978, McDole was a key defensive player at left defensive end for the NFL Washington Redskins, under head coach George Allen from 1971 to 1977, and, in his final year, under head coach Jack Pardee. By that time, he was quite slow, not a big threat as a pass-rusher, but very stout against the run, rarely out of position, and quick to seize opportunities for turnovers. In 1972, the Redskins won the NFC championship game of the 1972–73 NFL playoffs against the Dallas Cowboys, when they limited the Cowboys to 3 points, 96 rushing yards on 21 carries, and, despite Roger Staubach as their quarterback, to 73 net passing yards, as McDole held his own against the opposing right offensive tackle, Rayfield Wright, a member of the Pro Football Hall of Fame. However, the team lost Super Bowl VII to the Miami Dolphins, though the defense gave up just 253 total net yards and allowed only 14 points.

Career
McDole has the most interceptions ever by a lineman, with 12.  He is also ranked #44 on the all-time list of games played in the NFL.

Personal
Teammate Sonny Jurgensen gave him the nickname "The Dancing Bear" after showing off his moves at a Georgetown nightspot.

See also
 List of American Football League players

References

1939 births
Living people
American football defensive ends
Buffalo Bills players
Houston Oilers players
Nebraska Cornhuskers football players
St. Louis Cardinals (football) players
Washington Redskins players
American Football League All-Star players
American Football League All-Time Team
People from Meigs County, Ohio
Sportspeople from Toledo, Ohio
Players of American football from Ohio
American Football League players